John Norman Cowley (7 February 1885 – 5 August 1957) was an English first-class cricketer.

Born at Marylebone, Cowley made his debut in minor counties cricket for Hertfordshire against Cambridgeshire at Fenner's in 1908. He played infrequently for Hertfordshire  up until 1911, making a total of five appearances in the Minor Counties Championship. He appeared in a first-class cricket match for the Free Foresters against Oxford University at Oxford in 1914. Batting twice in the match, he was dismissed without scoring by John Heathcoat-Amory in the Free Foresters first-innings, while in their second-innings he was dismissed by Orme Bristowe for the same score. He served in the London Regiment during World War I, initially as a private before promotion to lieutenant in February 1915. He died at Bovingdon in Hertfordshire in August 1957. His grandfather was the first-class cricketer Robert Broughton.

References

External links

1885 births
1957 deaths
People from Marylebone
English cricketers
Hertfordshire cricketers
Free Foresters cricketers
British Army personnel of World War I
London Regiment officers
Military personnel from Middlesex
Artists' Rifles soldiers